DII may refer to:
 Days in inventory, an accounting term
 Dii, the Thracian tribe
 Dii language
 DiI, a hydrophobic cyanine dye used in cell biology
 Dietary Inflammatory Index
 Delegation of the Ismaili Imamat, the Delegation of the Ismaili Imamat
 Diablo II, a sequel to the computer game Diablo
 Division II, a competition level in the National Collegiate Athletic Association (NCAA)
 Defence Information Infrastructure, the UK's secure military communications network
 Dynamic Invocation Interface, part of the CORBA standard
 502, DII in Roman numerals

See also
 D2 (disambiguation), including a list of topics named D.II, etc.